Nanette is a feminine given name.  By 2013, the name was considered to be on the verge of extinction in the United States; it had been among the top 1000 baby names until 1977, and had reached a peak in usage in 1956.

Notable people with the name include:

Nanette Bordeaux (1911–1956), Canadian-born American actress
Nanette Burstein (born 1970), American film and television director
Nanette M. DeRenzi, United States Navy admiral
Nanette Fabray (born 1920), American actress, comedian, singer, dancer and activist
Nanette Gartrell, American psychiatrist and writer
Nanette Hansen, American journalist
Nanette Hassall (born 1947), Australian dancer
 Nannette Johnston (born 1782), British actress
Nanette Kay Laughrey (born 1946), American judge
Nanette Lepore (born 1964), American fashion designer
Nanette Maxine, American singer
Nanette Milne (born 1942), Scottish politician
Nanette Newman (born 1934), English actress and writer
Nanette Workman (born 1945), American singer-songwriter, actress and writer
Nanette Barragan (born 1976), American politician
Nanette Blitz Konig (born 1929), Holocaust survivor

Other uses
Nanette (show), stand-up act by Australian comedian Hannah Gadsby
The Groovy Girls doll line, by Manhattan Toy, features a doll named Nanette.
"Nanette: An Aside", a short story by Willa Cather

See also
5852 Nanette, main-belt asteroid
Nanetti

References